The Henderson Subdivision is a railroad line owned by CSX Transportation in the U.S. states of Indiana, Kentucky, and Tennessee. At its north end the line continues south from the Evansville Terminal Subdivision and at its south end it continues south as the Nashville Terminal Subdivision. The line also includes the Cut-Off Main, Morganfield Branch, MH&E Branch & River Branch.

See also
 List of CSX Transportation lines

References

CSX Transportation lines
Rail infrastructure in Tennessee
Rail infrastructure in Kentucky
Rail infrastructure in Indiana